Nisreen Elsaim is a Sudanese youth climate activist and climate negotiator. She is on the UN's Youth Advisory Group on Climate Change after a nomination by the Pan African Climate Justice Alliance. Elsaim is president of the Sudan Youth for Climate Change. She was an organizer of the 2019 Youth Climate Summit.

Elsaim holds a Physics and Renewable energy degree from the University of Khartoum. She has actively been involved in youth climate activism since 2012.

References

External links 

 Talk by Nisreen Elsaim at the For Women in Science programme on YouTube

Year of birth missing (living people)
Living people
Sudanese activists
University of Khartoum alumni
Climate activists